The Burç Bendi Dam is a gravity dam on the Göksu River (a tributary of the Euphrates), near the village of Burç in Adıyaman district, Adıyaman Province, Turkey. Its primary purpose is hydroelectric power generation and it supports a 27.9 MW run-of-the-river power station. Construction on the dam began in January 2008 and it was fully operational by 3 November 2010. It is owned and operated by ČEZ Group.

See also

List of dams and reservoirs in Turkey

References

Dams in Adıyaman Province
Dams completed in 2010
Gravity dams
Dams in the Euphrates River basin
Hydroelectric power stations in Turkey
Run-of-the-river power stations
2010 establishments in Turkey
Energy infrastructure completed in 2010
21st-century architecture in Turkey